{{DISPLAYTITLE:C24H29NO}}
The molecular formula C24H29NO may refer to:

 Δ4-Abiraterone, a steroidogenesis inhibitor and active metabolite of abiraterone acetate
 Phenomorphan, an opioid analgesic

Molecular formulas